"The Detail" is the second episode of the first season of the HBO original television series, The Wire (2002-2008). The episode was written by David Simon from a story by David Simon and Ed Burns and was directed by Clark Johnson. It originally aired on June 9, 2002.

Plot

Bunk and McNulty investigate Gant's murder. McNulty believes the Barksdales had him killed as a show of force towards potential witnesses; Bunk is skeptical that anybody would kill a witness after they had already testified. McNulty visits Judge Phelan, who pressures Deputy Commissioner Burrell to have Lieutenant Daniels allow McNulty on the case. Mollified, Phelan agrees not to call the media about the murder.

Daniels and his detail arrive at their new office - a damp basement with little furniture. The rest of the detail is introduced, but Daniels dismisses them all as useless "humps", especially after officer Roland "Prez" Pryzbylewski accidentally discharges his weapon indoors. When Daniels visits Assistant State's Attorney Rhonda Pearlman to complain, she tells him that Prez was nearly indicted for shooting his own patrol car. Daniels confides that he feels that Burrell sent him a message by not allowing him to pick his detail. He meets with Lieutenant Cantrell and convinces him to assign Detective Leander Sydnor (Cantrell's best man) to counterbalance Prez (his worst).

Carver, Greggs, and Herc surreptitiously photograph Bubbles as he marks Barksdale dealers by pretending to sell them red hats. When Greggs brings Bubbles in to identify the dealers, McNulty is surprised by the scale of the Barksdale Organization. Bunk and McNulty visit D'Angelo in the Pit to press him on the Gant murder. When D'Angelo refuses to cooperate, they arrest him. Under interrogation, they play upon D'Angelo's conscience; he is moved to begin writing a letter of condolence to Gant's family. Barksdale attorney Maurice Levy arrives and stops D'Angelo from further self-incrimination.

Greggs and McNulty show the letter to Daniels, who is skeptical about its usefulness in building a case. Now free, D'Angelo takes his girlfriend, Donette, and their infant son to a family party, where Avon rebukes him for the letter. While drinking late at night, Herc, Carver, and Prez decide to intimidate the Barksdales. Prez pistol-whips a teenager, Kevin Johnston, for leaning on his car and mouthing off, prompting a hail of projectiles and gunshots from the towers. Herc is injured as Carver calls for back-up. The next day, Daniels berates the three and asks who hit Johnston. Prez confesses and Daniels instructs him to lie about his actions and suggests a plausible story. He warns Prez that he must be convincing or he cannot protect him.

Bunk informs McNulty that the Gant murder has made the front page and that Phelan appears to be the source. Major Rawls becomes enraged yet again. McNulty visits Phelan, who denies alerting the media, but quickly leaves. Alone, McNulty drinks heavily and is too inebriated to effectively intervene in a nearby car theft. Daniels dines with his wife Marla, who admonishes him for covering up police brutality. She counsels him to withdraw from the politically charged case. Daniels is later awakened with news that Johnston has permanently lost use of one eye.

Production

Title reference
The title refers to the newly formed Barksdale detail.

Epigraph

This line is spoken in a conversation with Marla's husband Cedric about his impossible position of running the Barksdale investigation while trying to further his career. Extended to the episode as a whole, the quote can also mean that if you do not become involved with the drug trade, commonly referred to as "The Game", you will not lose your life. This is most obviously evidenced in the episode by the murder of William Gant, about which D'Angelo exclaims, "he ain't have to testify";  if Gant had chosen not to testify he would not have become involved in D'Angelo's murder trial and would have still been alive.

Credits

Guest stars

Reception
The "Chicken McNugget" scene is often cited by fans, and some reviewers, as being one of the most memorable moments in the show. Poot and Wallace speculate that the man who invented Chicken McNuggets must be rich, and D'Angelo explains to them that McDonald's owns the rights to the McNugget, and the man who invented it likely received nothing for it and is now probably "working in the basement for regular wage thinking of some shit to make the fries taste better." Wallace responds with "he still had the idea though." Ironically for D'Angelo, the man who invented the Chicken McNugget, Herb Lotman, was in fact a very wealthy and successful man; founder of one of the largest beef and chicken suppliers in the world, his net worth was estimated at $15 billion.

References

External links
"The Detail" at HBO.com

 Guardian blogpost on this episode by Paul Owen

The Wire (season 1) episodes
2002 American television episodes
Television episodes directed by Clark Johnson
Television episodes written by David Simon